The Johnson-Walsh Baronetcy, of Ballykilcavan, was a title in the Baronetage of Ireland. It was created on 24 February 1775 for John Allen Johnson, who changed his name by royal licence in 1809 to John Allen Johnson-Walsh. He was the elder brother of Sir Henry Johnson, 1st Baronet, of Bath (see Johnson Baronets). He was M.P. for Baltinglass from 1784 to 1790, and High Sheriff of Queen's County for 1792.

The title became extinct on the death of the fifth Baronet in 1953.

Johnson-Walsh baronets, of Ballykilcavan (1775)
Sir John Allen Johnson-Walsh, 1st Baronet (–1831)
Sir Edward John Johnson-Walsh, 2nd Baronet (c. 1785–1848)
Sir Hunt Henry Johnson-Walsh, 3rd Baronet (1787–1865)
Sir John Allen Johnson-Walsh, 4th Baronet (1829–1893)
Sir Hunt Henry Allen Johnson-Walsh, 5th Baronet (1864–1953)

See also
Johnson baronets

Notes

References
Kidd, Charles, Williamson, David (editors). Debrett's Peerage and Baronetage (1990 edition). New York: St Martin's Press, 1990, 

Johnson-Walsh